Muha may refer to:

Muha (surname)
Muha (commune), Bujumbura Mairie Province, Burundi
Muha Vas, a village in Slovenia
José Martí International Airport (ICAO code: MUHA)

See also
 
Mucha
Mukha